Joseph or Joe Palmer may refer to:

Joe Palmer (football manager) (c. 1890–?), British football manager
Joe Palmer (politician), Republican Idaho State Representative 
Joseph Palmer (American Revolutionary War general) (1716–1788)
Joseph Palmer (communard) (1791–1874), American Transcendentalist, member of the Fruitlands commune
Joseph Palmer II (1914–1994), American foreign service officer and ambassador
Joseph B. Palmer (1825–1890), American lawyer, legislator, and Confederate general in the American Civil War
Joseph Palmer (priest) (died 1829), Irish Anglican priest